The Postman Always Rings Twice is a 1981 American neo-noir erotic thriller film directed by Bob Rafelson and written by David Mamet (in his screenwriting debut). Starring Jack Nicholson and Jessica Lange, it is the fourth adaptation of the 1934 novel by James M. Cain. The film was shot in Santa Barbara, California.

Plot
Frank Chambers (Jack Nicholson), a drifter, stops at a Depression-era rural California diner in the hills outside Los Angeles for a meal and ends up working there. The diner is operated by a young, beautiful woman, Cora Smith (Jessica Lange), and her much older husband, Nick Papadakis (John Colicos), a hardworking but unimaginative immigrant from Greece.

Frank and Cora start to have an affair soon after they meet. Cora is tired of her situation, married to an older man she does not love, and working at a diner that she wishes to own and improve. She and Frank scheme to murder Nick to start a new life together without her losing the diner. Their first attempt at the murder is a failure, but they succeed with their second attempt.

The local prosecutor suspects what has actually occurred but does not have enough evidence to prove it. As a tactic intended to get Cora and Frank to turn on one another, he tries only Cora for the crime.

Although they turn against each other, a clever ploy from Cora's lawyer, Katz (Michael Lerner), prevents Cora's full confession from coming into the hands of the prosecutor. With the tactic having failed to generate any new evidence for the prosecution, Cora benefits from a deal in which she pleads guilty to manslaughter and is sentenced to probation.

Months later, Frank has an affair with Madge Gorland (Anjelica Huston) while Cora is out of town. When Cora returns, she tells Frank she is pregnant. That night, Katz's assistant, Kennedy (John P. Ryan), appears at their door and threatens to expose them unless they give him $10,000. Enraged, Frank beats Kennedy up and strong-arms him into giving up the evidence against them.

When Frank returns, he finds that Madge has been to see Cora, who threatens to turn him in. They eventually patch together their tumultuous relationship and now plan for a future together. However, on the way back after having been married, Cora dies in a car accident while Frank is driving. Frank weeps over Cora's body.

Cast
 Jack Nicholson – Frank Chambers
 Jessica Lange – Cora Smith/Papadakis
 John Colicos – Nick Papadakis
 Michael Lerner – Mr. Katz
 John P. Ryan – Ezra Liam Kennedy
 Anjelica Huston – Madge Gorland
 William Traylor – Kyle Sackett
 Ron Flagge – Shoeshine Man
 William Newman – Man from Home Town
 Chuck Liddell – Boy Scout
 Albert Henderson – Art Beeman
 Christopher Lloyd – Salesman

Soundtrack
On May 14, 2012 Intrada Records released Michael Small's complete score for the first time.

Release and reception
The film was screened out of competition at the 1981 Cannes Film Festival.  Upon release, the film was poorly received by many critics, who felt that the remake of the 1946 film of the same name was wasted. They also believed the ending was "very weak" compared to the original film. They also criticized that the meaning of the title is not explained in the remake, which led to confusion among viewers. Jack Nicholson later said "If you ran a question through this industry about The Postman Always Rings Twice, most people would surmise that it wasn't successful. That is not true. I know it made money, because I received overages, so it must've grossed about as much as Chinatown and much more than Carnal Knowledge. But people are anxious to disqualify it."

The film has since been received more favorably; it scores a 79% "fresh" rating on Rotten Tomatoes, with 11 positive reviews and three negative. Kerry Segrave and Linda Martin praised the "charged chemistry" between Nicholson and Lange, and stated that Nicholson admitted that he was smitten with his co-star, remarking that she was a "big consensus movie sex bomb". The film was nominated by the American Film Institute in 2002 for the
AFI's 100 Years...100 Passions list.

The star of the 1946 version, Lana Turner, did not watch the remake, but said she had seen advertisements and blurbs on television that made her sick: she resented how the studio "turned it into such pornographic trash".

Notes
Warner Bros. Pictures currently holds the rights to the film. Turner Entertainment currently holds only the 1946 version (as part of pre-May 20, 1986 Metro-Goldwyn-Mayer library), not the second adaptation (since Lorimar produced this film), but WB owns both films.

See also
 Le Dernier Tournant, the 1939 French film adaptation of the novel
 Ossessione ("Obsession"), the 1943 Italian film adaptation of the novel
 The Postman Always Rings Twice, the 1946 American film adaptation of the novel
 Body Heat, a 1981 neo-noir film with similar themes, released five months after this film
 The Postman Always Rings Twice, a 1982 opera based on the novel
 Jerichow, the 2008 German film loosely based on the novel

References

External links
 
 
 
 
 
 

1981 films
1981 crime drama films
Adultery in films
American crime drama films
Remakes of American films
1980s English-language films
Films about murderers
Films based on American novels
Films based on mystery novels
Films based on works by James M. Cain
Films directed by Bob Rafelson
Films set in California
Films set in 1934
Metro-Goldwyn-Mayer films
Paramount Pictures films
Films with screenplays by David Mamet
Films scored by Michael Small
American neo-noir films
Films produced by Bob Rafelson
1980s American films